Sigma Persei (Sigma Per, σ Persei, σ Per) is an orange K-type giant with an apparent magnitude of +4.36.  It is approximately 360 light years from Earth.

Sigma Persei is moving through the Galaxy at a speed of 17.4 km/s relative to the Sun. Its projected Galactic orbit carries it between 24,400 and 43,600 light years from the center of the Galaxy. It came closest to the Sun 5.1 million years ago when it had brightened to magnitude 3.11 from a distance of 202 light years.

It has one reported planet, b, with a period of 580 days and a mass approximately 6.5 times that of Jupiter.

Name and etymology
This star, together with δ Per, ψ Per, α Per, γ Per and η Per, has been called the Segment of Perseus.

References

Persei, Sigma
Perseus (constellation)
K-type giants
Persei, 35
016335
1052
021552
BD+47 843
Suspected variables